JTV is the third studio album by Hong Kong singer Justin Lo. It was released on November 16, 2007 and sold 20,000 copies in the first two days.

Track listing
"WA-KA-BAM (Intro)"
"紅地氈"
"一句"
"男人KTV"
"遲鈍"
"貝殼"
"兩個女人"
"Morning After"
"難關"
"卡通歌"
"頭條新聞"
"Stuck On U"
"路人甲 (國語)"
"c u in my dream (Outro)"

External links
Album's information on moov.hk (in Chinese)

Justin Lo albums
2007 albums